USCGC Triton may refer to:

 Triton was a 165-foot cutter which operated out of Coast Guard Base 15 at Biloxi, Mississippi during what was referred to at the time as "the Prohibition War"—with operations against alcohol smugglers during Prohibition in the United States.
 , was a patrol boat commissioned in 1934 and served until 1967

See also
 
 

United States Coast Guard ship names